Shiori Goto: Best is the first greatest hits album by Japanese singer-songwriter Shiori Niiyama. It released on 30 January 2018 under Being Inc. label. It was also her final work before her hiatus announcement.

Background

The album was released as promotion for her 5th year of singer debut anniversary.

The album includes a complete collection of all singles by chronological releases, since their her single "Yureru Yureru" until her latest single "Sayonara Watashi no Koigokoro".

Some tracks like "Kei", "Koi no Naka" and "Snow Smile" were previously released in her third and final studio album Finder no Mukou.

The 9th single Sayonara Watashi no Koigokoro was included for the first time in the album format. The bonus track, "Dakarasa -acoustic version-" which was released in 2012 as a pre-debut single, was included in album for the first time, however in her debut album Shiori was released only the re-recorded version of Dakarasa, without acoustic guitar.

First press release includes additional DVD disc with eleven music video clips in full version, while short versions were previously uploaded on YouTube. 

A special content website "Shiori 5th Anniversary best" was launched in November 2017 with albums informations, preview tracks, self liner notes by Shiori herself and congratulation comments by various people from music industry, included Sakura Fujiwara and producer Masanori Sasaji.

Track listing

In media
Yureru Yureru was used as insert theme song for movie Zekkyō Gakkyū
Don't cry was used as theme song for movie Zekkyō Gakkyū
Hitori Goto was used as ending theme for Tokyo Broadcasting System Television program CDTV
Ima Koko ni Iru was used as commercial song for Kuraray company
 Zettai was used as ending theme for Tokyo Broadcasting System Television program "King's Brunch" (Oujisama no Brunch)
 Arigatou was used as theme song for Chiba TV program "Music Launcher"
Tonari no Yukue was used as an opening theme for Nihon TV music program "Buzz Rhythm"
Mou, Ikanakucha. was used as theme song for movie Hotel Coban
Atashi wa Atashi no Mama de was used as official image song for Nihon TV programMusical Instrument Fair 2016
Koi no Naka was used as insert song for drama Love song
Kei was used as ending song for movie Koto
Snow Smile was used as commercial song for event Fuyu Spo!! Winter Sports Festa16

References

2018 compilation albums
Shiori Niiyama albums
Japanese-language compilation albums